The Baptist Convention of Iowa is a group of churches affiliated with the Southern Baptist Convention located in the U.S. state of Iowa. Headquartered in Des Moines, it is made up of about 110 churches and five Baptist associations.

Associations
 Great Rivers
 Metro
 Northeast
 Northwest
 Southwest

References

External links 
 Baptist Convention of Iowa website

Baptist Christianity in Iowa
Iowa